The Red Terror in Soviet Russia was a campaign of political repression and executions carried out by the Bolsheviks, chiefly through the Cheka, the Bolshevik secret police. It started in late August 1918 after the beginning of the Russian Civil War and lasted until 1922.

Arising after assassination attempts on Vladimir Lenin and Petrograd Cheka leader Moisei Uritsky, the latter of which was successful, the Red Terror was modeled on the Reign of Terror of the French Revolution, and sought to eliminate political dissent, opposition, and any other threat to Bolshevik power. More broadly, the term is usually applied to Bolshevik political repression throughout the Civil War (1917–1922), as distinguished from the White Terror carried out by the White Army (Russian and non-Russian groups opposed to Bolshevik rule) against their political enemies, including the Bolsheviks.

Estimates for the total number of victims of Bolshevik repression vary widely in numbers and scope. One source gives estimates of 28,000 executions per year from December 1917 to February 1922. Estimates for the number of people shot during the initial period of the Red Terror are at least 10,000. Estimates for the whole period go for a low of 50,000 to highs of 140,000 and 200,000 executed. The most reliable estimations for the number of executions in total put the number at about 100,000.

Bolshevik justification 

The Red Terror in Soviet Russia was justified in Soviet historiography as a wartime campaign against counter-revolutionaries during the Russian Civil War of 1918–1921, targeting those who sided with the White movement. Bolsheviks referred to any anti-Bolshevik factions as Whites, regardless of whether those factions actually supported the White cause. Leon Trotsky described the context in 1920:

He then contrasted the terror with the revolution and provided the Bolshevik's justification for it:

Martin Latsis, chief of the Ukrainian Cheka, stated in the newspaper Red Terror:

It should also be noted, however, that Latsis' suggestions never became official policy. On the contrary, Lenin himself considered that such a policy of indiscriminate killing would be 'fraught with untold harm to communism,' as this would preclude the ability to recruit sympathetic members of the former ruling classes and their resources to the Bolshevik cause: 

Against Latsis, Lenin's position was that reprisals should only be directed against those members of hostile classes, who were actively working to undermine and suppress the revolution, and he was against collective punishment.

The bitter struggle was described succinctly from the Bolshevik point of view by Grigory Zinoviev in mid-September 1918:

A completely different point of view from those of the Bolsheviks was expressed in November 1918 by the Left Socialist Revolutionary leader Maria Spiridonova, at the time in prison awaiting trial. In her Open Letter to the Central Executive of the Bolshevik party, she wrote:

History 
The Red Terror campaign is considered to have officially begun between 17 and 30 August 1918 as retribution for two assassination attempts (one of which was successful). The official decree of a "Red Terror," however, came a few days later, in September.

Background 
In December 1917 Felix Dzerzhinsky was appointed to the duty of rooting out counterrevolutionary threats to the Soviet government. He was the director of the All-Russian Extraordinary Commission (aka Cheka), a predecessor of the KGB that served as the secret police for the Soviets.

From early 1918 Bolsheviks started physical elimination of opposition and other socialist and revolutionary fractions:

On 11 August 1918, prior to the events that would officially catalyze the Terror, Vladimir Lenin had sent telegrams "to introduce mass terror" in Nizhny Novgorod in response to a suspected civilian uprising there, and to "crush" landowners in Penza who resisted, sometimes violently, the requisitioning of their grain by military detachments:

On 17 August 1918, Petrograd Cheka leader Moisei Uritsky was assassinated by Leonid Kannegisser; shortly after, on August 30, Fanni Kaplan unsuccessfully attempted to assassinate Vladimir Lenin.

These attacks would finally persuade the government to heed Dzerzhinsky's lobbying for greater internal security. The campaign of mass repressions would officially begin thereafter as retribution.

Repression begins 
While recovering from his wounds, Lenin instructed: "It is necessary – secretly and urgently to prepare the terror." In immediate response to the two attacks, Chekists killed approximately 1,300 "bourgeois hostages" held in Petrograd and Kronstadt prisons.

Bolshevik newspapers were especially integral to instigating an escalation in state violence: on August 31, the state-controlled media launched the repressive campaign through incitement of violence. One article appearing in Pravda exclaimed: "the time has come for us to crush the bourgeoisie or be crushed by it.... The anthem of the working class will be a song of hatred and revenge!" The next day, the newspaper Krasnaia Gazeta stated that "only rivers of blood can atone for the blood of Lenin and Uritsky."

The first official announcement of a Red Terror was published in Izvestia on September 3, titled "Appeal to the Working Class", calling for the workers to "crush the hydra of counter-revolution with massive terror!"; it would also make clear that "anyone who dares to spread the slightest rumor against the Soviet regime will be arrested immediately and sent to a concentration camp". Izvestia also reported that, in the 4 days since the attempt on Lenin, over 500 hostages had been executed in Petrograd alone.

Subsequently, on September 5, the Central Committee of the Bolshevik government issued a decree "On Red Terror", prescribing "mass shooting” to be "inflicted without hesitation;" the decree ordered the Cheka "to secure the Soviet Republic from the class enemies by isolating them in concentration camps", as well as stating that counter-revolutionaries "must be executed by shooting [and] that the names of the executed and the reasons of the execution must be made public."

The government executed 500 "representatives of overthrown classes" (kulaks) immediately after the assassination of Uritsky. Soviet commissar Grigory Petrovsky called for an expansion of the Terror and an "immediate end of looseness and tenderness."

In October 1918, Cheka commander Martin Latsis likened the Red Terror to a class war, explaining that "we are destroying the bourgeoisie as a class."

On October 15, the leading Chekist Gleb Bokii, summing up the officially-ended Red Terror, reported that, in Petrograd, 800 alleged enemies had been shot and another 6,229 imprisoned. Casualties in the first two months were between 10,000 and 15,000 based on lists of summarily executed people published in newspaper Cheka Weekly and other official press. A declaration About the Red Terror by the Sovnarkom on 5 September 1918 stated:

As the Russian Civil War progressed, significant numbers of prisoners, suspects and hostages were executed because they belonged to the "possessing classes". Numbers are recorded for cities occupied by the Bolsheviks:

In Kharkov there were between 2,000 and 3,000 executions in February–June 1919, and another 1,000–2,000 when the town was taken again in December of that year; in Rostov-on-Don, approximately 1,000 in January 1920; in Odessa, 2,200 in May–August 1919, then 1,500–3,000 between February 1920 and February 1921; in Kiev, at least 3,000 in February–August 1919; in Ekaterinodar, at least 3,000 between August 1920 and February 1921; In Armavir, a small town in Kuban, between 2,000 and 3,000 in August–October 1920. The list could go on and on.

In Crimea, Béla Kun and Rosalia Zemlyachka, with Vladimir Lenin's approval, had 50,000 White prisoners of war and civilians summarily executed by shooting or hanging after the defeat of general Pyotr Wrangel at the end of 1920. They had been promised amnesty if they would surrender. This is one of the largest massacres in the Civil War.

On 16 March 1919, all military detachments of the Cheka were combined in a single body, the Troops for the Internal Defense of the Republic, which numbered 200,000 in 1921. These troops policed labor camps, ran the Gulag system, conducted prodrazvyorstka (requisitions of food), and put down peasant rebellions, riots by workers, and mutinies in the Red Army (which was plagued by desertions).

One of the main organizers of the Red Terror for the Bolshevik government was 2nd-Grade Army Commissar Yan Karlovich Berzin (1889–1938), whose real name was Pēteris Ķuzis. He took part in the October Revolution of 1917 and afterwards worked in the central apparatus of the Cheka. During the Red Terror, Berzin initiated the system of taking and shooting hostages to stop desertions and other "acts of disloyalty and sabotage".  As chief of a special department of the Latvian Red Army (later the 15th Army), Berzin played a part in the suppression of the Russian sailors' mutiny at Kronstadt in March 1921. He particularly distinguished himself in the course of the pursuit, capture, and killing of captured sailors.

Repressions 
Among the victims of the Red Terror were tsarists, liberals, non-Bolshevik socialists, members of the clergy, ordinary criminals, counter-revolutionaries, and other political dissidents. Later, industrial workers who failed to meet production quotas were also targeted.

The first victims of the Terror were the Socialist Revolutionaries (SR). Over the months of the campaign, over 800 SR members were executed, while thousands more were driven into exile or detained in labor camps. In a matter of weeks, executions carried out by the Cheka doubled or tripled the amount of death sentences pronounced by the Russian Empire over its 92-year period from 1825 to 1917. While the Socialist Revolutionaries were initially the primary targets of the terror, most of its victims were associated with the Tsarist autocracy.

Peasants 

The Internal Troops of the Cheka and the Red Army practiced the terror tactics of taking and executing numerous hostages, often in connection with desertions of forcefully mobilized peasants. According to Orlando Figes, more than 1 million people deserted from the Red Army in 1918, around 2 million people deserted in 1919, and almost 4 million deserters escaped from the Red Army in 1921. Around 500,000 deserters were arrested in 1919 and close to 800,000 in 1920 by Cheka troops and special divisions created to combat desertions. Thousands of deserters were killed, and their families were often taken hostage. According to Lenin's instructions,

In September 1918, in just twelve provinces of Russia, 48,735 deserters and 7,325 brigands were arrested: 1,826 were executed and 2,230 were deported. A typical report from a Cheka department stated:

Estimates suggest that during the suppression of the Tambov Rebellion of 1920–1921, around 100,000 peasant rebels and their families were imprisoned or deported and perhaps 15,000 executed.

This campaign marked the beginning of the Gulag, and some scholars have estimated that 70,000 were imprisoned by September 1921 (this number excludes those in several camps in regions that were in revolt, such as Tambov). Conditions in these camps led to high mortality rates, and "repeated massacres" took place. The Cheka at the Kholmogory camp adopted the practice of drowning bound prisoners in the nearby Dvina river. Occasionally, entire prisons were "emptied" of inmates via mass shootings prior to abandoning a town to White forces.

Industrial workers 
On 16 March 1919, Cheka stormed the Putilov factory. More than 900 workers who went to a strike were arrested, of whom more than 200 were executed without trial during the next few days. Numerous strikes took place in the spring of 1919 in cities of Tula, Oryol, Tver, Ivanovo and Astrakhan. Starving workers sought to obtain food rations matching those of Red Army soldiers. They also demanded the elimination of privileges for Bolsheviks, freedom of the press, and free elections. The Cheka mercilessly suppressed all strikes, using arrests and executions.

In the city of Astrakhan, a revolt led by the White Guard forces broke out. In preparing this revolt, the Whites managed to smuggle more than 3000 rifles and machine guns into the city. The leaders of the plot decided to act on the night 9–10 March 1919. The rebels were joined by wealthy peasants from the villages, which suppressed the Committees of the Poor, and committed massacres against rural activists. Eyewitnesses reported atrocities in villages such as Ivanchug, Chagan, Karalat. In response, Soviet forces led by Kirov undertook to suppress this revolt in the villages, and together with the Committees of the Poor restored Soviet power. The revolt in Astrakhan was brought under control by 10 March, and completely defeated by the 12th. More than 184 were sentenced to death, including monarchists, and representatives of the Kadets, Left-Socialist Revolutionaries, repeat offenders, and persons shown to have links with British and American intelligence services. The opposition media with political opponents like Chernov, and Melgunov, and others would later say that between 2,000 and 4,000 were shot or drowned from 12 to 14 of March 1919. 

However, strikes continued. Lenin had concerns about the tense situation regarding workers in the Ural region. On 29 January 1920, he sent a telegram to Vladimir Smirnov stating "I am surprised that you are putting up with this and do not punish sabotage with shooting; also the delay over the transfer here of locomotives is
likewise manifest sabotage; please take the most resolute measures."

At these times, there were numerous reports that Cheka interrogators used torture.  At Odessa the Cheka tied White officers to planks and slowly fed them into furnaces or tanks of boiling water; in Kharkiv, scalpings and hand-flayings were commonplace: the skin was peeled off victims' hands to produce "gloves"; the Voronezh Cheka rolled naked people around in barrels studded internally with nails; victims were crucified or stoned to death at Dnipropetrovsk; the Cheka at Kremenchuk impaled members of the clergy and buried alive rebelling peasants; in Oryol, water was poured on naked prisoners bound in the winter streets until they became living ice statues; in Kyiv, Chinese Cheka detachments placed rats in iron tubes sealed at one end with wire netting and the other placed against the body of a prisoner, with the tubes being heated until the rats gnawed through the victim's body in an effort to escape.

Executions took place in prison cellars or courtyards, or occasionally on the outskirts of town, during the Red Terror and Russian Civil War. After the condemned were stripped of their clothing and other belongings, which were shared among the Cheka executioners, they were either machine-gunned in batches or dispatched individually with a revolver. Those killed in prison were usually shot in the back of the neck as they entered the execution cellar, which became littered with corpses and soaked with blood. Victims killed outside the town were moved by truck, bound and gagged, to their place of execution, where they sometimes were made to dig their own graves.

According to Edvard Radzinsky, "it became a common practice to take a husband hostage and wait for his wife to come and purchase his life with her body". During decossackization, there were massacres, according to historian Robert Gellately, "on an unheard of scale". The Pyatigorsk Cheka organized a "day of Red Terror" to execute 300 people in one day, and took quotas from each part of town. According to the Chekist , the Cheka in Kislovodsk, "for lack of a better idea", killed all the patients in the hospital. In October 1920 alone more than 6,000 people were executed. Gellately adds that Communist leaders "sought to justify their ethnic-based massacres by incorporating them into the rubric of the 'class struggle.

Clergy and religious 
Members of the clergy were subjected to particularly brutal abuse. According to documents cited by Alexander Yakovlev, then head of the Presidential Committee for the Rehabilitation of Victims of Political Repression, priests, monks and nuns were crucified, thrown into cauldrons of boiling tar, scalped, strangled, given Communion with melted lead and drowned in holes in the ice. An estimated 3,000 were put to death in 1918 alone.

Interpretations by historians 
Historians such as Stéphane Courtois and Richard Pipes have argued that the Bolsheviks needed to use terror to stay in power because they lacked popular support. Although the Bolsheviks dominated among workers, soldiers and in their revolutionary soviets, they won less than a quarter of the popular vote in elections for the Constituent Assembly held soon after the October Revolution, since they commanded much less support among the peasantry. The Constituent Assembly elections predated the split between the Right SRs, who had opposed the Bolsheviks, and the Left SRs, who were their coalition partners, consequentially many peasant votes intended for the latter went to the SRs. Massive strikes by Russian workers were "mercilessly" suppressed during the Red Terror.

According to Richard Pipes, terror was inevitably justified by Lenin's belief that human lives were expendable in the cause of building the new order of communism. Pipes has quoted Marx's observation of the class struggles in 19th century France: "The present generation resembles the Jews whom Moses led through the wilderness. It must not only conquer a new world, it must also perish in order to make room for the people who are fit for a new world", but noted that neither Karl Marx nor Friedrich Engels encouraged mass murder. Robert Conquest was convinced that "unprecedented terror must seem necessary to ideologically motivated attempts to transform society massively and speedily, against its natural possibilities."

Orlando Figes' view was that Red Terror was implicit, not so much in Marxism itself, but in the tumultuous violence of the Russian Revolution. He noted that there were a number of Bolsheviks, led by Lev Kamenev, Nikolai Bukharin, and Mikhail Olminsky, who criticized the actions and warned that thanks to "Lenin's violent seizure of power and his rejection of democracy," the Bolsheviks would be "forced to turn increasingly to terror to silence their political critics and subjugate a society they could not control by other means." Figes also asserts that the Red Terror "erupted from below. It was an integral element of the social revolution from the start. The Bolsheviks encouraged but did not create this mass terror. The main institutions of the Terror were all shaped, at least in part, in response to these pressures from below."

The German Marxist Karl Kautsky pleaded with Lenin against using violence as a form of terrorism because it was indiscriminate, intended to frighten the civilian population and included the taking and executing hostages: "Among the phenomena for which Bolshevism has been responsible, terrorism, which begins with the abolition of every form of freedom of the Press, and ends in a system of wholesale execution, is certainly the most striking and the most repellent of all."

In The Black Book of Communism, Nicolas Werth contrasts the Red and White Terrors, noting the former was the official policy of the Bolshevik government:

The Bolshevik policy of terror was more systematic, better organized, and targeted at whole social classes. Moreover, it had been thought out and put into practice before the outbreak of the civil war. The White Terror was never systematized in such a fashion. It was almost invariably the work of detachments that were out of control, and taking measures not officially authorized by the military command that was attempting, without much success, to act as a government. If one discounts the pogroms, which Denikin himself condemned, the White Terror most often was a series of reprisals by the police acting as a sort of military counterespionage force. The Cheka and the Troops for the Internal Defense of the Republic were a structured and powerful instrument of repression of a completely different order, which had support at the highest level from the Bolshevik regime.

James Ryan points out that Lenin never advocated for the physical extermination of the entire bourgeoisie as a class, just the execution of those who were actively involved in opposing and undermining Bolshevik rule. He did intend to bring about "the overthrow and complete abolition of the bourgeoisie", but through non-violent political and economic means.

Leszek Kołakowski noted that while Bolsheviks (especially Lenin) were very much focused on the Marxian concept of "violent revolution" and dictatorship of the proletariat long before the October Revolution, implementation of the dictatorship was clearly defined by Lenin as early as in 1906, when he argued it must involve "unlimited power based on force and not on law," power that is "absolutely unrestricted by any rules whatever and based directly on violence." In The State and Revolution of 1917, Lenin once again reiterated the arguments raised by Marx and Engels calling for use of terror. Voices such as Kautsky calling for moderate use of violence met "furious reply" from Lenin in The Proletarian Revolution and the Renegade Kautsky (1918). Another theoretical and systematic argument in favor of organized terror in response to Kautsky's reservations was written by Trotsky in The Defense of Terrorism (1921). Trotsky argued that in the light of historical materialism, it is sufficient that the violence is successful for it to justify its rightness. Trotsky also introduced and provided ideological justification for many of the future features characterizing the Bolshevik system such as "militarization of labor" and concentration camps.

Historical significance 

The Red Terror was significant because it was the first of numerous Communist terror campaigns which were waged in Soviet Russia and many other countries. It also triggered the Russian Civil War according to historian Richard Pipes. Menshevik Julius Martov wrote about Red Terror:

The beast has licked hot human blood. The man-killing machine is brought into motion ... But blood breeds blood ... We witness the growth of the bitterness of the civil war, the growing bestiality of men engaged in it.

The term 'Red Terror' was later used in reference to other campaigns of violence which were waged by communist or communist-affiliated groups. Some other events which were also called "Red Terrors" include:
 Hungarian Red Terror — the execution of 590 people who were accused of being involved in the counterrevolutionary coup against the Hungarian Soviet Republic on 24 June 1919.
 Spanish Red Terror — assassinations which were carried out during the Spanish Civil War.
 Red Terror (Greece) — a campaign of repression which was waged in Greece by the Communist organizations of the Greek Resistance (during the Axis occupation of Greece which coincided with World War II) and the Greek Civil War (1943–49).
 Ethiopian Red Terror — a campaigned of repression which was waged by the Derg during the rule of Mengistu Haile Mariam.
 Chinese Red Terror — a campaign of repression which is believed to have begun with the Red August of the Cultural Revolution. According to Mao Zedong himself: "Red terror ought to be our reply to these counter-revolutionaries. We must, especially in the war zones and in the border areas, deal immediately, swiftly with every kind of counter-revolutionary activity."
 Indian Red Terror — a name which was given to the "Nandigram violence" (November 2007) in Nandigram, West Bengal, critics use it in order to allude to the actions of the local administration Communist Party of India, the ruling party in West Bengal. The situation was also called a "Red Terror" by the media.
 Finnish Red Terror — the 1918 Civil War in Finland.
 Yugoslavian Red Terror — another name for the period from 1941 to 1942 in Yugoslavia known as the "Leftist errors."

See also

Notes

References and further reading 
See also: 
 
 
 
 
 

 See also text on marxists.org.

External links
Down with the Death Penalty! by Yuliy Osipovich Martov, June/July 1918
The Record of the Red Terror by Sergei Melgunov
More 'red terror' remains found in Russia UPI, July 19, 2010.

Mass murder in 1918
Political and cultural purges
Political repression in the Soviet Union
Communist terrorism
Politicides
Russian Civil War
Soviet war crimes

War crimes in Russia